Jazzical is the second solo album by jazz pianist Mike Garson. It was released in 1982.

Background
The expression "jazzical" was first used by Charles Mingus as the title of his two-part album Jazzical Moods (1955). "Jazzical" connotes a blend of jazz and classical musics, as does the musical theory third stream.

Track listing

Personnel
Mike Garson - piano
Abraham Laboriel - bass
David Campbell - viola, string arrangements
Carol Shive, Charles Veal - violin
Chick Corea - synthesizer on "Song for Thee"

References

Mike Garson albums
1982 albums